Neotelphusa traugotti is a moth of the family Gelechiidae. It is found in the Spain.

The wingspan is about 10 mm. The forewings are fuscous, mottled with light grey, ochreous and black scales. There is a blackish, indistinct band near the base and two black patches at the costa at one-third and two-thirds, as well as two black spots surrounded with ochreous scales in the middle of the wing. There are also three groups of raised ochreous scales in the middle of the wing, as well as a thin black line from the middle of the wing into the apex. The hindwings are dark grey, lighter towards the base. Adults have been recorded on wing in July and August.

Etymology
The species is named after Mr. Ernst Traugott-Olsen, who first collected the species.

References

Moths described in 2001
Neotelphusa